The Lancia D24 was a sports racing car introduced by Lancia in 1953, and raced in the 1953 and 1954 seasons. It kept the overall layout of its predecessor the D23—that is a multi-tubular frame chassis, double wishbones/De Dion suspension, transaxle transmission and a barchetta body—but had a large 3,284 cc V6 engine.

Some of the D24's most significant overall victories are those by Juan Manuel Fangio in the 1953 Carrera Panamericana, by Alberto Ascari in the 1954 Mille Miglia, and by Piero Taruffi in the 1954 Targa Florio and Giro di Sicilia.

In 1955, the President of Lancia presented a D24 to President Juan Perón of Argentina who raced it nationally in the blue and yellow national livery. It was returned to Italy in the 1980s and restored by the Count Vittorio Zanon. This is one of just two D24s in existence; the other is in the Lancia Museum.

Racing
Lancia D24 Spider won 1954 Mille Miglia driven by Alberto Ascari. The previous year it had already taken Juan Manuel Fangio and Gino Bronzoni to victory at the Carrera Panamericana.

References

Bibliography

External links

D24
Sports racing cars
Carrera Panamericana
Mille Miglia
Winner